Russia participated at the 2017 Summer Universiade in Taipei, Taiwan. Russia sent a delegation of 348 sportspeople and 169 assistants this time. Of those, 13 athletes were Merited Masters of Sport and 81 world-class Masters of Sport.

Medals by sport
Mixed events (*) are listed as both women and men.

Medalists

Sportspeople

Archery

Compound

Recurve

Athletics

11 athletics were to participate, but Russia did not send any sportsperson in this sport due to the fact that all of them participated under neutral flag at the 2017 World Athletics Championships. Several issues referred to the International University Sports Federation were not resolved.

Badminton

Baseball

Group stage

Consolation round

Basketball

Men's tournament

Group stage

|}

Classification rounds

Women's tournament

Group stage

|}

Quarterfinals

Semifinals

Bronze medal game

Diving

Men

Women

Mixed

Team classification

Qualification legend: QF – Qualify to final; SA – Qualify to Semifinal Group A; SB – Qualify to Semifinal Group B

Fencing

Men

Women

Football

Men's tournament

Group stage

Quarterfinals

Women's tournament

Group stage

Quarterfinals

Semifinals

Bronze medal game

Golf

Gymnastics

Artistic gymnastics
Men
Team

Individual finals

Women
Team

Individual finals

Rhythmic gymnastics

Judo

Men

Women

Roller Sports

Men

Women

Swimming

Men

Women

Table tennis

Individuals

Doubles

Teams

Taekwondo

Tennis

Men

Team classification

Women

Mixed

Volleyball

Men's tournament

Group play

|}

Quarterfinals

Semifinals

Final

Women's tournament

Group play

|}

Quarterfinals

Semifinals

Final

Water polo

Men's tournament

Preliminary round

Eightfinals

Quarterfinals

Semifinals

Final

Women's tournament

Preliminary round

Quarterfinals

Semifinals

Bronze medal game

Weightlifting

Men

Women

Wushu

Men
Sanda

Taolu

Women
Sanda

Taolu

See also
Russia at the Universiade

References

External links
Overview

Nations at the 2017 Summer Universiade
Universiade
2017